The Jat people are a community native to India and Pakistan. The following is a list of notable Jats.

Religion
Baba Buddha, companion of the guru Nanak and one of the most revered saints in Sikhism
Bhai Bala, follower and companion of Guru Nanak (first Guru of Sikhism) and one of the most revered in Sikhism
Bhai Mani Singh
Bidhi Chand
Dharam Singh, Panj Pyare
Randhir Singh, founder of Akhand Kirtani Jatha

Rulers, chieftains, and warriors

Akali Phula Singh, Sikh warrior and a Nihang leader
Ala Singh Jat, Maharaja of Patiala
Ali Mohammad Khan, ruler of Rohailkhand.
Baba Deep Singh, ruler of Shaheedan Misl
Badan Singh
Baghel Singh, ruler of Singh Krora Misl
Bhim Singh Rana, Maharaja of Gohad State, and Gwalior State
Bhuma Singh Dhillon, chieftain of Bhangi Misl
Bhupinder Singh of Patiala
Brijendra Singh, the last ruler of Bharatpur State and a former Member of Parliament
Charat Singh, founder of Sukerchakia Misl
Chhajja Singh Dhillon, founder and chieftain of Bhangi Misl
Churaman
Ganda Singh Dhillon, chieftain of Bhangi Misl
Gokula, chieftain of Tilpat
Gujjar Singh Banghi, a sikh Jat warrior and one of the triumvirates who ruled over Lahore prior to the leadership of Maharaja Ranjit Singh
Hari Singh Dhillon, ruler of Bhangi Misl
Heera Singh Sandhu, founder of Nakai Misl
Hira Singh Nabha, ruler of Nabha State
Jai Singh Kanhaiya, founder of Kanhaiya Misl
Jawahar Singh
Jhanda Singh Dhillon, chieftain of Bhangi Misl
Kishan Singh, ruler of Bharatpur State
Mai Bhago, Sikh soldier and Guru Gobind Singh's bodyguard
Nahar Singh, ruler of Ballabgarh estate who fought the British East India Company in the Indian Rebellion of 1857
Nawab Kapur Singh, ruler of Singhpuria Misl
Pratap Singh Nabha, last ruler of Nabha State
Raja Maldeo, ruler of Sidhmukh State
Rajaram of Sinsini, chieftain of Sinsini
Ranjit Singh, Emperor of the Sikh Empire,
Saadullah Khan, Grand Vizier of Mughal Empire
Sada Kaur, chief of Kanhaiya Misl
Sardar Tara Singh Ghaiba, chieftain of Dallewalia Misl
Suraj Mal, ruler of Bharatpur State
Udaybhanu Singh, ruler of the Dholpur State
Jind Kaur, Maharani of Sikh Empire who fought two wars against the British

Revolutionaries and freedom fighters

Achhar Singh Chhina, freedom fighter and politician
Baba Gurdit Singh, leader of the Komagata Maru incident
Bhagat Singh, Indian socialist revolutionary who was executed by the British colonialists in 1931
Kartar Singh Sarabha, Indian freedom fighter
Lothoo Nitharwal, Indian freedom Fighter
Rai Ahmad Khan Kharal, freedom fighter in the Indian Rebellion of 1857
Raja Mahendra Pratap, Indian freedom fighter
Sah Mal, rebel who fought against the British in Indian Rebellion of 1857
Sohan Singh Bhakna, founding president of the Ghadar party
Teja Singh Sutantar, freedom fighter and a member of Ghadar Party

Politics

India

 Ajit Singh, former Minister of Agriculture and Minister of Civil Aviation
 Baldev Singh, former Defence Minister of India
 Balram Jakhar, longest serving Speaker of the Lok Sabha, Parliament of India
 Bansi Lal, former Chief Minister of Haryana
 Beant Singh, former Chief Minister of Punjab
 Chaudhary Bharat Singh former Member of Parliament and Congress leader from Delhi
 Bhupinder Singh Hooda, former Chief Minister of Haryana
Charan Singh, the sixth Prime Minister of India
Chhotu Ram, co-founder of Unionist party and a Jat leader of the colonial era
 Darbara Singh, former Chief Minister of Punjab
Devi Lal, former Deputy Prime Minister of India and former Chief Minister of Haryana
Gian Singh Rarewala, former Premier and former Chief Minister of Patiala and East Punjab States Union (PEPSU)
Gurnam Singh, former Chief Minister of Punjab
Harcharan Singh Brar, former Chief Minister of Punjab
Harkishan Singh Surjeet, former Communist leader from Punjab
Harlal Singh, farmer leader of colonial India
 Hukam Singh, former Chief Minister of Haryana
 Jagdeep Dhankhar, 14th Vice President of India, former Governor of West Bengal and Minister of State, Government of India
Lachhman Singh Gill, former Chief Minister of Punjab
Partap Singh Kairon, former Chief Minister of Punjab
 Parvesh Verma Indian politician
 Ram Niwas Mirdha, former Deputy Chairperson of the Rajya Sabha
 Ranbir Singh Hooda, Indian independence activist and former Congress leader from Haryana
Sahib Singh Verma, former Chief Minister of Delhi
 Sis Ram Ola, former Union Minister of Labour and Employment, recipient of Padma Shri Award  for social service in 1968
 Sukhbir Singh Badal, former Deputy Chief Minister of Punjab
Surjit Singh Barnala, former Chief Minister of Punjab
 Swaran Singh, former Minister of External Affairs and Minister of Defence
 Raja Man singh, former Indian politician and titular head of princely Bharatpur State
Bhagwant Mann, Chief Minister of Punjab
Natwar Singh, former diplomat and former Minister of External Affairs (India)
Gurdial Singh Dhillon, former two-time Speaker of the Lok Sabha and former President of Inter-Parliamentary Union
Harchand Singh Longowal
Jagdev Singh Talwandi
Nathuram Mirdha, former minister of Food and Civil Supplies
Daulat Ram Saran, former Minister of Urban Development
Fateh Singh
Jagjit Singh Lyallpuri, co-founder of Communist Party of India (Marxist) and former general secretary of All India Kisan Sabha

Pakistan

 Feroz Khan Noon, Seventh Prime minister of Pakistan
 Liaquat Ali Khan, First Prime Minister of Pakistan
 Chaudhry Mumtaz Jajja - Member of the National Assembly of Pakistan (MNA)
 Muhammad Rafiq Tarar, Ninth President of Pakistan
 Sikandar Hayat Khan, former Premier of the Punjab
 Muhammad Zafarullah Khan, 1st Minister of Foreign Affairs of Pakistan and President of the United Nations General Assembly
Shahbaz Gill, Chief of Staff of Pakistan's former Prime Minister Imran Khan
Chaudhry Zahoor Elahi,

Social reformers 
 Bhagat Dhanna
 Karmabai
 Swami Keshwanand, social reformer

Poets and writers 

 Faiz Ahmed Faiz, Pakistani revolutionary poet
Qadir Yar
Sukhpal Vir Singh Hasrat
Jaswant Singh Kanwal
Kulwant Singh Virk
Sant Singh Sekhon, Punjabi writer
Daljit Nagra
Fauji Kavi Mehar Singh, Haryanvi language poet and a freedom fighter

Armed forces and Police

Arjan Singh, former Chief of the Indian Air Force
Badlu Singh, recipient of Victoria Cross
Chhelu Ram, recipient of Victoria Cross
Gian Singh, recipient of Victoria Cross
Hoshiar Singh Dahiya, recipient of Param Vir Chakra 
Kanwar Pal Singh Gill
Lt General Khem Karan Singh, recipient of Mahavir Chakra
Mohan Singh, founder and General of the First Indian National Army
Nirmal Jit Singh Sekhon, recipient of Param Vir Chakra
Parkash Singh, recipient of Victoria Cross
Ranjit Singh Dyal
Richhpal Ram, recipient of Victoria cross
Sant Singh recipient of Mahavir Chakra
Shabeg Singh
Ved Prakash Malik, 19th Chief of Army Staff of the Indian Army

Sports 

 Avneet Sidhu Indian sport shooter
 Bajrang Punia, Olympic bronze medal winner
 Balbir Singh Sr., Indian Hockey Player
 Balwinder Sandhu former Indian cricketer
Chandgi Ram,
Chandro Tomar,
 Deepa Malik, Paralympic Silver medal winner
 Krishna Poonia, discus thrower and track and field athlete
 Monty Panesar former England cricketer
 Navjot Singh Sidhu former Indian cricketer
 Pargat Singh former Indian hockey player
 Praveen Kumar former Indian cricketer
 Savita Punia Indian hockey player
 Shikhar Dhawan, Indian cricketer
 Vijender Singh, Olympic bronze medal winner
 Virender Sehwag, former Indian cricketer
 Yuvraj Singh, former Indian cricketer

Cinema and television

Arjan Bajwa, Indian film actor
Dara Singh, Indian film actor
Darshan Kumar, Indian film actor
Dharmendra, Indian film actor
Kabir Duhan Singh Indian film actor
Kirron Kher, Indian film actress
Mahie Gill, Indian film actress
Mallika Sherawat, Indian film actress
Meghna Malik, Indian TV actress
Mohit Ahlawat , Indian film actor
Parvin Dabas, Indian film actor
Rajat Tokas, Indian TV actor
Randeep Hooda, Indian film actor
Simran Mundi, Indian film actress
Sunny Deol, Indian film actor
Sushant Singh, Indian film and TV actor
Taapsee Pannu, Indian film actress
Vivek Dahiya, Indian TV actor

Singers 
 Labh Janjua, Indian Punjabi-language singer
 Mohammed Rafi, Indian playback singer and musician
 Sidhu Moose Wala, Indian Punjabi-language singer

Criminals 
 Jagga Jatt, a 20th-century heroic rebel of Punjab. He is known as the Robin Hood of Punjab for "robbing from the rich and giving to the poor"

Others
Anubhav Singh Bassi Indian comedian
Dhruv Rathee Indian YouTuber
Jarnail Singh Bhindranwale, jathedar of Damdami Taksal
Kahn Singh Nabha, Sikh scholar
Satendra Singh disability activist
 Seth Chhaju Ram, Philanthropist

See also
List of Jat dynasties and states

References

Lists of people by ethnicity
List